Vaghodiya is one of the 182 Legislative Assembly constituencies of Gujarat state in India. It is part of Vadodara district.

List of segments
This assembly seat represents the following segments,

 Vaghodia Taluka
 Vadodara Taluka (Part) Villages – Sokhda, Padmala, Anagadh, Ajod, Asoj, Virod, Sisva, Dasharath, Dhanora, Kotna, Koyli, Dumad, Dena, Sukhlipur, Amaliyara, Kotali, Vemali, Gorva, Ankodiya, Sherkhi, Nandesari (CT), Nandesari (INA), Ranoli (CT), Petro-Chemical Complex (INA), Karachiya (CT), GSFC Complex (INA), Bajwa (CT), Jawaharnagar (Gujarat Refinery) (CT).

Member of Legislative Assembly

Election results

2022

2017

2012

2002

See also
 List of constituencies of Gujarat Legislative Assembly
 Gujarat Legislative Assembly

References

External links
 

Assembly constituencies of Gujarat
Vadodara district